Naddaf is a surname. Notable people with the surname include:

 Gabriel Naddaf (born 1973), Israeli priest
 Marie Claude Naddaf, Syrian activist

See also
 
 Nadaf

Arabic-language surnames